University of Pattimura is a public university in Ambon, Maluku, Indonesia. It was established on April 23, 1963. Its current rector is Prof. Dr. M. J. Saptenno, SH. M.Hum.

History 
Pattimura University was founded on the initiative of Dr. J. B. Sitanala and several community leaders who embody the aspirations of the people to participate in the development of the nation and country, especially in the fields of higher education and the development of science. The West Irian Maluku Higher Education Foundation was formed on July 20, 1955 chaired by Cornelis Loppies who succeeded in establishing the Faculty of Law on October 3, 1956. October 3, 1956 was then designated as the birthday of Pattimura University. On October 6, 1959, the Faculty of Social and Politics was opened, followed by the opening of the Teaching and Education Faculty on September 10, 1961. In order to fulfill the requirements to become a state university, two faculties of exact sciences were opened, namely the Faculty of Agriculture, Forestry and the Faculty of Animal Husbandry, on December Sept. 1, 1963.

On August 1, 1962 the West Irian Maluku Higher Education Foundation turned into a State University with the Decree of the Minister of PTIP Number 99 of 1962 dated August 8, 1962 with five Faculties, namely:
 Faculty of Law
 Faculty of Teaching and Education Sciences
 Faculty of Social Science and Political Science
 Faculty of Forestry Agriculture
 Faculty of Animal Husbandry

President Sukarno through Presidential Decree Number 66 of 1963 dated 23 April 1963 authorized the establishment of a university in Ambon which was named Pattimura University.

Faculty of Economics opened September 15, 1965,

The Faculty of Engineering was opened on April 16, 1970 by utilizing the extravagant buildings of the Ambon Faculty of Technology (FTA) project. In August 1964 the Faculty of Teaching and Education Sciences changed its status to become IKIP Jakarta Ambon Branch with its Chancellor Drs. F.F.H. Matruty. Then on September 16, 1969, the Ambon Branch of the Ambon Branch of the Jakarta Teachers' Training College was reintegrated into Pattimura University into two faculties, namely the Teaching Faculty and the Educational Sciences Faculty. In 1974 the Faculty of Animal Husbandry was supplemented by the Department of Fisheries and at the same time underwent a name change to the Faculty of Animal Husbandry/Fisheries.

Chancellor / University Leaders 
Initially, Pattimura University based on Presidential Decree No. 66 of 1963 dated April 23, 1963 was led by a presidium consisting of
 Soemitro Hamidjoyo, S.H. - Chairman
 Muhammad Padang|Mohammad Padang - Member
 Drs. Soehardjo - Member
 Colonel Boesiri - Member
Dr.M.Haulussy - Member
Furthermore, led by the chancellor as follows
lr. L. Nanlohy, appointed as the first Chancellor of Pattimura University, Presidential Decree No. 40/M of 1971.
M.R. Lestaluhu, S.H. Appointed as Chancellor of Unpatti Presidential Decree No. 69/M of 1976, Presidential Decree No. 43/M of 1981 (second term).
Dr. lr. J.Ch. Lawalatta, M.Sc. appointed as Chancellor University of Pattimura. Presidential Decree Number 89/M of 1985.
Prof. DR. lr. J.L. Nanere, M.Sc. stipulated by Presidential Decree Number 247/M of 1989.
Dr. M. Huliselan as Chancellor of Pattimura University, Presidential Decree No. 207/M of 1994,
Prof. Dr. H.B. Tetelepta, MPd, first period 2004-2008 and second period 2008 - 2012.
 Prof Dr. Thomas Pentury, M.Si, period 2012 - 2016,
Prof. Dr. Marthinus Johanes Saptenno, SH., M.Hum, period 2016 to date

Faculty 
Based on Presidential Decree Number 73 of 1982 concerning the organizational structure of Pattimura University, currently Pattimura University has 9 Faculties and Postgraduate Programs, with stages of Bachelor, Professional, Masters and Doctoral Education, namely:

 Faculty of Teaching and Education Sciences
 History Education Study Program
 Geography Education Study Program
 Economic Education Study Program
 Pancasila and Citizenship Education Study Program (PPKN)
Accounting Education Study Program
Elementary School Teacher Education Study Program (PGSD)
Prodi Health and Recreation Physical Education (PJKR)
Guidance and Counseling Study Program (BK)
 Non-formal Education/Out-of-School Education Study Program (PLS/PNF)
Educational Administration Study Program
 Mathematics Education Study Program
 Physics Education Study Program
Chemical Education Study Program
 Biology Education Study Program
 English Education Study Program
 Indonesian Language and Literature Education Study Program
 German Language Education Study Program
Teacher Professional Education Study Program (PPG)
 Faculty of Law
 Study Program of Law
 Faculty of Economics and Business
 Accounting major
 Management major
Department of Development Economics
 Faculty of Social and Political Sciences
 Sociology Study Program
Public Administration Study Program
Government Science Study Program
Communication Science Study Program
 Faculty of Agriculture
 Agricultural Agribusiness Study Program
 Animal Husbandry Study Program
 Agrotechnology Study Program
 Agricultural Product Technology Study Program
Prodi Forestry
Environmental Science Study Program
 Forest Management Study Program
 Faculty of Fisheries & Marine Sciences
 Water Resources Management Study Program
 Fisheries Product Technology Study Program
 Fishery Agribusiness Study Program
Marine Science Study Program
Prodi Utilization of Water Resources
Prodi Aquaculture
 Faculty of Engineering
 Mechanical Engineering Study Program
Shipping Engineering Study Program
 Marine Engineering Study Program
Industrial Engineering Study Program
 Civil Engineering Study Program
 Urban Area Planning Engineering Study Program
 Electrical Engineering Study Program
 Informatics Engineering Study Program
 Department of Geological Engineering 
 MIPA Faculty
 Mathematics Study Program
 Biology Study Program
 Physics Study Program
Chemistry Study Program
Statistics Study Program
 Biotechnology Study Program
 Computer Science Study Program
 Medical School
 Medical Education Study Program
 Doctor Profession Program
 Graduate program
Doctor of Law Science
Doctor of Marine Science
Doctor of Educational Administration
 Doctor of Biology Education
 Master of Public Administration
 Master of Sociology
 Master of Biology Education
 Master of English
 Masters in German
 Master of Marine & Small Island Management
 Master of Forest Management
 Master of Management
 Master of Land Management
 Master of Economics
 Master of Education Management
 Master of Law

Planned
 Faculty of Energy and Petroleum

References

External links
 Official site

Universities in Indonesia
Educational institutions established in 1963
1963 establishments in Indonesia
Universities in Maluku (province)
Indonesian state universities